James Herbert Gholson (1798July 2, 1848) was a nineteenth-century congressman, planter, lawyer and judge from Virginia.

Early and family life
Born in Gholsonville, Brunswick County, Virginia to William Gholson and his wife Mary Saunders. He had a brother Thomas Saunders Gholson. Gholson was educated by tutors, then attended Princeton College and graduated in 1820. He married Charlotte L. Carey in Southampton, Virginia on November 22, 1827.

Career
He studied law and was admitted to the bar, commencing practice in Percivals, Virginia. By 1830, his household included five white persons and 25 enslaved persons.

His uncle Thomas Gholson Jr. who died in 1816 had represented Brunswick County in the Virginia General Assembly and later the U.S. House of Representatives, and James Herbert Gholson soon carried on the family tradition. Voters elected him as one of their part-time representatives in the Virginia House of Delegates, where he served from 1824 to 1828 and again from 1830 until 1833, when he was elected to fill a vacancy caused by the death of Congressman John Claiborne. Sixty percent were the enslaved Brunswick County. He spoke about Nat Turner in Virginia General Assembly.

Elected as an Anti-Jacksonian to the United States House of Representatives in 1832, Gholson failed to win re-election, and his 1834 defeat by his sometimes co-delegate in the Virginia House of Delegates and unsuccessful opponent two years earlier, George Dromgoole, marked the demise of the Whig party in Brunswick County. Afterwards, the Virginia General Assembly elected Gholson as a judge of the circuit court for the Brunswick circuit, and he served for many years despite a controversy the year before his death alleging partiality toward his brother, who would later serve in the Second Confederate Congress.

Death and legacy
Gholson died in Brunswick County on July 2, 1848, and was buried at Blandford Cemetery in Petersburg, Virginia.

Electoral history

1833; Gholson was elected to the U.S. House of Representatives with 37.62% of the vote, defeating Democrat George Coke Dromgoole and Independents William Osborne Goode and Alexander G. Knox.
1835; Gholson lost his re-election bid to Dromgoole.

References

External links

1798 births
1848 deaths
Members of the Virginia House of Delegates
Virginia lawyers
Princeton University alumni
19th-century American politicians
National Republican Party members of the United States House of Representatives from Virginia
19th-century American lawyers
19th-century American judges
People from Brunswick County, Virginia
Burials at Blandford Cemetery
Virginia circuit court judges